Grog is an alcoholic beverage.

Grog or Grogs may also refer to the following:

Arts and entertainment
 Grog (film), a 1982 Italian film starring Franco Nero
 Grogs (Known Space), a fictional alien species in Larry Niven's Known Space universe
 Grog (Marvel Comics), a fictional character in Marvel Comics
 Grog, a character in the B.C. comic strip
 Grog Strongjaw, a goliath barbarian / fighter in the D&D web series Critical Role
 The Grogs, a Canadian puppet troupe
 Grogs (YTV), various puppet characters

Other uses
 Grog (clay), a raw material for making ceramics
 Operation Grog, a British Second World War operation
 Grog Run (Ohio), a stream in Ohio, United States
 Grog Run (Buffalo Creek tributary), a river in West Virginia, United States
 Grog, a member of the British band Die So Fluid and a former member of Feline
 Count Grog, American professional wrestling manager, referee, ring announcer, commentator, promoter and booker Greg Mosorjak (born 1961)
 Kava grog, a non-alcoholic beverage made of kava root

See also
 Edward Vernon (1684–1757), English naval officer nicknamed "Old Grog"
 Grogg, a Welsh clay caricature
 Grogger (disambiguation)